Aliabad (also Romanized as ‘Alīābād) is a village in Qahab-e Jonubi Rural District, in the Central District of Isfahan County, Isfahan Province, Iran. At the 2006 census, its population was 21, in 6 families.

References 

Populated places in Isfahan County